The 2019 XingPai China Open was a professional ranking snooker tournament, that took place between 1–7 April 2019 in Beijing, China. It was the nineteenth and penultimate ranking event of the 2018/2019 season.

Neil Robertson won his second China Open title, and the 16th ranking title of his career, defeating Jack Lisowski 11–4 in the final.

Mark Selby was the two-time reigning champion, having defended his 2017 title with an 11–3 win against Barry Hawkins in the 2018 final. However, he lost 3–6 to Craig Steadman in qualifying.

Stuart Bingham made the highest break of the event, with his fifth 147 break of his career in his second round match with Peter Ebdon. It was the 151st 147 in snooker history.

Prize fund
The breakdown of prize money is shown below.

 Winner: £225,000
 Runner-up: £90,000
 Semi-final: £45,000
 Quarter-final: £27,000
 Last 16: £18,000
 Last 32: £11,000
 Last 64: £5,000

 Televised highest break: £7,000
 Total: £1,000,000

The "rolling 147 prize" for a maximum break: £20,000

Main draw

Final

Qualifying
Qualifying – excluding held over matches – took place between 18 and 20 February 2019 at the Chase Leisure Centre in Cannock, England.
All qualifying matches were best of 11 frames.

Note

Century breaks

Main stage centuries
Total: 78 11 of these centuries were made in held over matches, by Ding Junhui, Xiao Guodong (2), Mark King, Harvey Chandler, Wu Yize, Soheil Vahedi, Craig Steadman and Mark Williams (3).

 147, 140, 116, 108, 104, 103, 101, 100  Stuart Bingham
 142, 108, 105  Craig Steadman
 141, 141, 138, 135, 119, 115, 100, 100  Neil Robertson
 139, 130, 116, 108, 102  Luca Brecel
 139  Ding Junhui
 136, 114, 108, 105  Jack Lisowski
 136, 120, 116, 107  Sam Craigie
 136  Kyren Wilson
 135, 119  Ben Woollaston
 134, 132, 130, 105  Scott Donaldson
 134, 132  Michael Holt
 134, 112  Liang Wenbo
 134  Zhou Yuelong
 133, 110  Xiao Guodong
 133, 100  Anthony McGill
 130, 107  Mark King
 130  Harvey Chandler
 129, 125  Hossein Vafaei
 128, 103  Stephen Maguire
 124  Nigel Bond
 124  Marco Fu
 120  Wu Yize
 119  Robbie Williams
 117  Ali Carter
 115, 103  Ken Doherty
 115  Soheil Vahedi
 111, 105  Li Hang
 109, 105, 102  Alan McManus
 108, 100  David Gilbert
 107  Joe O'Connor
 107  James Wattana
 106, 102, 101  Mark Williams
 104  Lu Ning
 104  Ricky Walden

Qualifying stage centuries
Total: 35

 146, 108  Hossein Vafaei
 143  Anthony Hamilton
 142, 118  Neil Robertson
 140  Ashley Hugill
 140  Thepchaiya Un-Nooh
 135  Barry Hawkins
 131  Matthew Stevens
 130  Fergal O'Brien
 129  Joe O'Connor
 128, 105  Xu Si
 127, 105  Ken Doherty
 117, 111  Matthew Selt
 116  Lu Ning
 111, 101  Gerard Greene
 108, 103  Chris Wakelin
 108  Luca Brecel
 108  Ryan Day
 108  Mei Xiwen
 106  Ian Burns
 104  Ricky Walden
 102, 101  Kyren Wilson
 102  Martin O'Donnell
 101  Rory McLeod
 101  Yuan Sijun
 100  Sam Baird
 100  Robert Milkins
 100  Joe Swail

References

China Open
China Open (snooker)
2010s in Beijing
China Open (snooker)
China Open (snooker)
Sports competitions in Beijing